Sea devil or Sea Devil may refer to:

Biology
 The manta ray, Manta birostris
Its relatives in the family Myliobatidae
 Deep-sea fishes in the family Ceratiidae
 The deep-sea fish black seadevil
 Members of the genus Lophius

Marine vessels
 USS Sea Devil, the name of more than one United States Navy ship
 HMS Sea Devil (P244), a British submarine launched in 1945
 USCGC Sea Devil (WPB-87368), a Marine Protector-class U.S. Coast Guard Cutter launched in 2007
 Seeteufel, a German amphibious submarine
 Seeteufel (1856), a Russian prototype submarine

Fiction
 Sea Devil (Doctor Who), a fictional monster in the Doctor Who television series
 The Sea Devils, a story in the above series
 The Sea Devils (Dungeons & Dragons), a sourcebook detailing the fictional aquatic race of the sahuagin for the game
 Sea Devils (comics), a team of characters in the DC comics universe; as well as the title of the comic starring them
 Sea Devils (1931 film), a 1931 film directed by Joseph Levering
 Sea Devils (1937 film), a 1937 American film directed by Benjamin Stoloff
 Sea Devils (1953 film), a 1953 film starring Rock Hudson
 A group of "sea devils" appear in L. Frank Baum's novel The Sea Fairies

Other
 The athletic teams of Cape Fear Community College in Wilmington, North Carolina
 Devil's Sea, an area of water south of Japan
 Sea Devils, an autobiographical memoir by Junio Valerio Borghese detailing his naval exploits

See also
 Hamburg Sea Devils (disambiguation)
 Sea wolf (disambiguation)
 Devilfish (disambiguation)